Jack Tuszyński (born 1956) is a Polish professor of oncology and physicist.

Biography
Tuszyński graduated with a master's degree in physics from the University of Poznan in 1980 and obtained his PhD in condensed matter physics three years later from the University of Calgary. He became a postdoctoral fellow at the chemistry department the same year. From 1983 to 1988 he worked at the Department of Physics of the Memorial University of Newfoundland, then worked in the same department at the University of Alberta for two years.  From 1990 to 1993 he was promoted to associate, then full professor,  and as of 2005 became Allard Chair of the Cross Cancer Institute. He also served in a Division of Experimental Oncology and is an editor of such journals as the Journal of Biological Physics, Research Letters in Physics and many others which brought him an h-index of 32 as of 2014.

Tuszyński was part of a team of researchers who found that anesthetic drugs allow cell microtubules to re-emit trapped light in a much shorter time than originally thought. They found that light caught inside an energy trap was re-emitted after a delay, and they propose that this process might be explained through quantum laws. With the use of an anesthetic, however, this delay was considerably shorter. The process of consciousness may be behind the delay.

References

See also
consciousness
Stuart Hameroff
Orchestrated objective reduction (Orch OR)
Roger Penrose
quantum superposition
Vlatko Vedral

Living people
1956 births
Polish oncologists
University of Calgary alumni
Academic staff of the University of Alberta
Academic staff of the Memorial University of Newfoundland